Domiciano Barrocal Gomes Cavém (21 November 1932 – 12 January 2005) was a Portuguese footballer who played mainly for Benfica in several positions, but mostly as a 
left winger and right back.

He appeared in 420 official games for his main club, scoring 104 goals and winning 16 major titles, including two European Cups.

Club career
Born in Vila Real de Santo António, Algarve, Cavém was the son of football player and manager Norberto Cavém (born 1904), being coached by his father at local club Lusitano FC. He signed with S.L. Benfica in 1955 from S.C. Covilhã where he had featured alongside brother Amílcar (1930), first displaying his versatility by playing as an inside forward, a centre forward or a left winger.

During his 14-year spell with the Lisbon side, Cavém gradually became a more defensive unit, first being a midfielder then a right or left back. In the 1958–59 season he scored a career-best 21 goals, helping them to win the national championship and the eventual double – in the year's Portuguese Cup final, against FC Porto, he netted the fastest-ever goal in the competition, after just 15 seconds for an eventual 1–0 win.

Cavém was present in four of the five European Cup finals played by Benfica in the 60s, winning the 1961 and 1962 editions and scoring in the latter against Real Madrid (5–3). He retired professionally in 1969, at the age of nearly 37.

International career
Cavém earned 18 caps for Portugal, and scored five times. He made his debut on 8 April 1956 in a 0–1 friendly defeat to Brazil, his last appearance being against the same opponent on 24 June 1965 (0–0 draw).

Cavém featured once in the 1966 FIFA World Cup qualifying campaign, the 2–1 home win over Romania in the Portuguese capital. He was overlooked for the finals in England, as the national team finished in a best-ever third-position.

Post-retirement
After retiring, Cavém embarked in a managerial career, with little success. He subsequently settled in Alcobaça, dying on 12 January 2005 in the hospital of Leiria after a battle with Alzheimer's disease; he was 72 years old.

Honours
Benfica
Primeira Liga: 1956–57, 1959–60, 1960–61, 1962–63, 1963–64, 1964–65, 1966–67, 1967–68, 1968–69
Taça de Portugal: 1956–57, 1958–59, 1961–62, 1963–64, 1968–69
Taça de Honra (3)
European Cup: 1960–61, 1961–62
Intercontinental Cup runner-up: 1961, 1962

References

External links
 
 

1932 births
2005 deaths
People from Vila Real de Santo António
Portuguese footballers
Association football defenders
Association football midfielders
Association football forwards
Association football utility players
Primeira Liga players
Liga Portugal 2 players
S.C. Covilhã players
S.L. Benfica footballers
UEFA Champions League winning players
Portugal international footballers
Portuguese football managers
Deaths from dementia in Portugal
Deaths from Alzheimer's disease
Sportspeople from Faro District